The Lainingthou Sanna Mahee Sanna Pung, Kangleipak, also known as the Lainingthou Sanamahi Sanapung (LSSP), is a non-governmental organization of the followers of the Sanamahism (traditional Meitei religion), dedicated to God Lainingthou Sanamahi and other ancient Meitei deities of Kangleipak.

Reviving extinct culture 
In June 2018, the LSSP organised the religious festival of Sanamahi Ahong Khong Chingba which was banned and extinct for 350 consecutive years. It was celebrated once again for peace and prosperity of the people in the Manipuri metropolis of Imphal. The religious event is accustomed to be celebrated on the 15th day of the Meitei lunar month of "Inga".

Meetei Chanu pageant 

The Lainingthou Sanamahi Sanapung (LSSP) organises the Meetei Chanu, a beauty pageant with the aim to preserve the Meitei cultural tradition among the generations of the present day youths, as well as to impart knowledge of the traditions and the customs of the Sanamahi religion to Meitei women. To organise the contest, the LSSP formed a committee under the supervision of Leishemba Sanajaoba, the titular King of Manipur.

Ningol Chakouba celebration 
On 29th November, 2015, the Lainingthou Sanamahi Sanapung celebrated Ningol Chakouba festival at Leimayon Arts Centre, Chingamakha in Imphal. The event was attended by Leishemba Sanajaoba, the titular king of Manipur.

Cheiraoba gift exchange 

In April 2017, the Lainingthou Sanamahi Sana Pung organised a gift exchange program in accordance to the Sajibu Nongma Panba Cheiraoba to celebrate the spirit of fraternity, at Leimayol Art Centre, Singjamei Chinga Makha in Imphal. During the event, women members of the LSSP also presented gifts to Leishemba Sanajaoba, the titular King of Manipur.

International activism 
In 2018, the Lainingthou Sanamahi Sana Pung, along with the United Committee Manipur, the Manipur PCC, the Manipur Pradesh Trinamool Congress and the Shiv Sena, raised their voices against the illegal encroachment issues with the India–Myanmar border areas.

See also 
 International Sanamahism Students' Association (ISSA) 
 Lainingthou Sanamahi Kiyong
 Nongmaiching Ching
 Marjing
 Marjing Polo Statue
 Marjing Polo Complex
 Heingang Ching
 Nikhil Manipuri Mahasabha
 Kangla
 Pakhangba Temple, Kangla
 Kangla Nongpok Thong
 Kangla Nongpok Torban

Notes

References

External links 
 Lainingthou Sanamahi Sanapung at 

Cultural organizations
International nongovernmental organizations
International organizations
Meitei culture
Non-governmental organizations
Organisations based in Imphal
Religious organizations
Sanamahism